Lafcadio Hearn (1850–1904), author best known for his books about Japan
 Lafcadio, a character in the André Gide novel Les caves du Vatican (1914) 
Lafcadio: The Lion Who Shot Back (1963), a children's book written and illustrated by Shel Silverstein
Lafcadio (2004), a rock album by the band As Tall As Lions
8114 Lafcadio, a main-belt asteroid named after Lafcadio Hearn